Acleris askoldana is a species of moth belonging to the family Tortricidae. It is found in Korea, China, Japan and Russia (Askold Island, Amur, Ussuri, Siberia).

The larva feeds on various plants including Abelia spathulata and Deutzia species (including Deutzia scabra).

References

Acleris askoldana at Natural History Museum Caterpillar Hostplants Database

askoldana
Moths described in 1881
Moths of Asia